Somniloquy is an EP by English band  Pram.

Track listing
Mother of Pearl
The Way of the Mongoose
Monkey Puzzle
Clock Without Hands
Bewitched (Plone Mix)
Play of the Waves (Balky Mule Mix)
Omnichord (Terry:Funken Mix)
The Last Astronaut (Andy Vtel Mix)
A Million Bubble Burst (Sir Real Mix)

2001 EPs
Pram (band) albums